Henry Mugwanya (born 10 August 1943) is a Ugandan boxer. He competed in the men's light heavyweight event at the 1964 Summer Olympics. At the 1964 Summer Olympics, he lost to Jürgen Schlegel of the United Team of Germany.

References

1943 births
Living people
Ugandan male boxers
Olympic boxers of Uganda
Boxers at the 1964 Summer Olympics
Place of birth missing (living people)
Light-heavyweight boxers